Siwana is one of the 200 Legislative Assembly constituencies of Rajasthan state in India. It is in Barmer district.

Members of the Legislative Assembly

Election results

2018

See also
List of constituencies of the Rajasthan Legislative Assembly
Barmer district

References

Barmer district
Assembly constituencies of Rajasthan